

National leaders 

 Note that the office of Governor-General was constitutionally above politics, but it is included on this page as it was a position of leadership.
 Bainimarama, Josaia Vorege (Frank), military administrator (2000, 2006 – 2007; interim Prime Minister of Fiji 2007–present).
 Bavadra, Timoci (1934–1989), Fiji Labour Party founder; Prime Minister (1987).
 Beddoes, Mick, Leader of the Opposition.
 Bokini, Ratu Ovini, Chairman of the Great Council of Chiefs (2004–present).
 Cakobau, Ratu Sir George (1912–1989), Vunivalu of Bau and first native-born Governor General (1973–1983)
 Chaudhry, Mahendra, first Indo-Fijian Prime Minister (1999–2000).
 Foster, Sir Robert Sidney, Governor-General (1970–1973).
 Ganilau, Bernadette, writer and United Peoples Party politician; Deputy Leader of the Opposition (2006–present).
 Ratu Epeli GANILAU, Chairman of the Great Council of Chiefs (2001–2004); founder of the National Alliance Party of Fiji.
 Ganilau, Ratu Sir Penaia, Governor-General (1983–1987) and President (1987–1993).
 Iloilo, Ratu Josefa (born 1920), President (2000–present)
 Luveni, Jiko, dentist and AIDS campaigner; Speaker of the Parliament of Fiji since 2014.
 Ma'afu, Enele, Tongan Prince and Fijian Chief (Tui Lau), 19th century.
 Madraiwiwi, Ratu Joni (born 1957), Vice-President (2004–present)
 Mara, Ro Lady Lala (1931–2004), former first lady and Roko Tui Dreketi; co-founder of the Soqosoqo ni Vakavulewa ni Taukei.
 Mara, Ratu Sir Kamisese (1920–2004), founder of the modern Fijian nation.  Prime Minister (1967–1992 – with one very brief interruption); President (1993–2000).
 Momoedonu, Ratu Tevita, Prime Minister (twice – 2000 and 2001); Ambassador to Japan.
 Nailatikau, Ratu Epeli (born 1941), President of Fiji (2009 - present), Parliamentary Speaker (2001–2006), former Cabinet Minister, and diplomat.
 Patel, Raojibhai Dahyabhai, Speaker of the House of Representatives (1972–1977).
 Qarase, Laisenia (born 1941), Prime Minister (2000–present)
 Rabuka, Sitiveni, military leader and politician.  Coup leader (1987); Prime Minister (1992–1999).
 Senilagakali, Jona, interim Prime Minister (2006–present); installed by military coup.
 Seniloli, Ratu Jope, Vice-President (2001–2004; convicted of treason.
 Sukuna, Ratu Sir Lala (1888–1958), the father of modern Fiji; Parliamentary Speaker.
 Takiveikata, Ratu Inoke, Vice-President of Fiji in the 1990s. (not to be confused with an imprisoned former Senator of the same name).
 Tavaiqia, Ratu Josaia, Tui Vuda and Vice-President (1990–1997).
 Waqavakatoga, Taito, President of the Fijian Senate.

Cabinet Ministers 

 Both present and former Cabinet Ministers are included.  Prime Ministers and other national leaders, however, are not.
 Ah Koy, James, Minister of Finance (1990s), Senator (2001–present).
 Ali, Ahmed (1938–2005), several times a cabinet minister.
 Baba, Tupeni, Deputy Prime Minister (1999–2000); founder of the New Labour Unity Party
 Bale, Manoa, former Cabinet Minister (1999–2000) Fiji Labour Party.
 Bale, Qoriniasi, Attorney-General and Minister of Justice (2000–present)
 Banuve, Joji, Cabinet Minister.
 Bogileka, Meli, former Cabinet Minister, General Secretary of the People's National Party.
 Bole, Filipe, former Foreign Minister
 Bulanauca, Mitieli, Senator and former Cabinet Minister.
 Bune, Poseci, Cabinet Minister and Deputy Leader of the Fiji Labour Party.
 Cakobau, Ratu Sir Edward, Deputy Prime Minister (1970s)
 Cakobau, Ratu Seru Epenisa, former monarch (1852–1874)
 Cakobau-Talakuli, Adi Samanunu: Tailevu chief, diplomat, and Cabinet Minister.
 Caucau, Adi Asenaca, Cabinet Minister.
 Cavubati, Viliame, Cabinet Minister (1990s)
 Cokanasiga, Joketani, former Cabinet Minister.
 Cokanauto, Ratu Tu'uakitau, former Cabinet Minister.
 Dakuidreketi, Keni, former Cabinet Minister.
 Delailomaloma, Nelson, former Cabinet Minister.
 Deoki, Andrew, pre- and post-independence politician; Attorney-General (1979–1981)
 Draunidalo, Savenaca, Minister for Works and Energy.
 Dyer, Adi Senimili, former Cabinet Minister.
 Galuinadi, Jonetani, Minister for Public Enterprises.
 Bernadette Rounds Ganilau, interim Cabinet Minister (appointed January 2007).
 Hatch, Hector, former Cabinet Minister.
 Kaitani, Simione, Cabinet Minister.
 Kepa, Ro Teimumu, Roko Tui Dreketi and Cabinet Minister.
 Korovulavula, Manu, interim Cabinet Minister (2007–present)
 Kubuabola, Ratu Inoke, diplomat, former Cabinet Minister, and former Soqosoqo ni Vakavulewa ni Taukei leader.
 Kubuabola, Ratu Jone, Minister of Finance.
 Kumar, Jainend, interim Cabinet Minister (appointed January 2007).
 Lalabalavu, Ratu Naiqama, Tui Cakau and politician, imprisoned for his role in the Fiji coup of 2000.
 Leweniqila, Isireli, Minister for Youth and Sports.
 Adi Malani, Laufitu, former Senator (2006) and Cabinet Minister (2007 – present)
 Mara, Ratu Finau, lawyer, former Cabinet Minister, and diplomat.
 Matanitobua, Ratu Suliano, Namosi Chief and former Cabinet Minister.
 Nacuva, Pita, Minister for Tourism (2005)
 Nagusuca, Nanise, Cabinet minister
 Nailatikau, Adi Koila (born 1953), Senator, former Cabinet Minister, and diplomat
 Naivalu, Solomone, Minister for Health.
 Narayan, Irene Jai (born 1932), former Cabinet Minister.
 Navakamocea, Jone, interim Cabinet Minister (appointed January 2007).
 Padarath, Lavenia, Cabinet Minister (1999–2000).
 Qetaki, Alipate, former Attorney-General and Minister for Justice.
 Raj, George Shiu, Cabinet Minister.
 Ratakele, Ratu Talemo, former Cabinet Minister.
 Rigamoto, Marieta, Cabinet Minister of Rotuman descent.
 Rokotuinaceva, Ratu Kolinio, former Cabinet Minister.
 Salabula, Losena, Cabinet Minister.
 Sauqaqa, Tomasi, Cabinet Minister.
 Sayed-Khaiyum, Aiyaz, interim Attorney-General (2007–present)
 Seruvakula, Ratu Semi, former Cabinet Minister.
 Sharma, Harish, National Federation Party leader and Deputy Prime Minister (1987).
 Sharma, Vivekanand, Alliance Party Senator and academic.
 Sikivou, Semesa, academic, Cabinet Minister, and diplomat.
 Singh, Anand Kumar, Fiji Labour Party Senator and former Attorney-General.
 Singh, Rajesh, Cabinet Minister (2006).
 Singh, Sir Vijay, former Cabinet Minister (not to be confused with the golfer of the same name).
 Speed, Adi Kuini, Deputy Prime Minister (1999–2000).
 Sukanaivalu, Netani, interim Cabinet Minister (appointed January 2007).
 Tabakaucoro, Adi Finau, former Cabinet Minister.
 Takiveikata, Ratu Inoke (born 1949), Qaranivalu of Naitasiri, former Cabinet Minister and Senator.  Imprisoned for mutiny.
 Tavola, Kaliopate, Foreign Minister (2000–present).
 Tikoinasau, Samisoni, Cabinet Minister.
 Tora, Apisai, Senator and former Cabinet Minister.
 Tuisese, Ilaitia, Minister for Agriculture.
 Tuvuki, Isireli, Cabinet Minister.
 Vakatale, Taufa, former Cabinet Minister.
 Vakatora, Tomasi, former Minister and House Speaker.
 Vosanibola, Josefa, Minister for Home Affairs (2005)
 Vuetilovoni, Tomasi, Minister for Commerce (2005)
 Vuibau, Tevita, interim Cabinet Minister (appointed January 2007).
 Waradi, Taito, businessman and interim Cabinet Minister (appointed January 2007).
 Wong, Pio, career soldier and Cabinet Minister.
 Yabaki, Konisi, Minister for Forests and Fisheries.
 Young, Ted, Cabinet Minister from Naitasiri Province.
 Zinck, Kenneth Vincent, Minister for Labour, Industrial Relations and Productivity (2001–present).

Colonial era politicians 
 This list includes politicians who served in the Legislative Council before responsible government was granted in 1967, but generally excludes politicians who played a significant role after independence in 1970.
 Buksh, M. S., Legislative Council Member (1947)
 Chalmers, Nathanael, Legislative Council Member (1879–1883)
 Chandra, Ami, Legislative Council Member (1947–1950)
 Deo, Vishnu, Legislative Council Member (1929; 1937–1959)
 Hasan, Said, Legislative Council Member (1937)
 Janniff, Ben, Legislative Council Member (1950–1953)
 Khan, A.H. Sahu, Legislative Council Member (1959–1963)
 Lakshman, B.D., labour union organiser and Legislative Council Member (1940–1944; 1959–1963)
 Maharaj, Badri – first ethnic Indian member of the Legislative Council (1917–1923; 1926–1929)
 Manu, A.R., Legislative Council Member (1956–1959)
 Mudliar, Muniswamy, Legislative Council Member (1932–1937)
 Narain, Sathi, Legislative Council Member (1959–1963)
 Patel, A. D., Legislative Council Member (1944–1950, 1963–1969)
 Prasad, Ayodhya, Legislative Council Member (1953–1959); a founding member of the Alliance Party
 Rao, James Ramchandar, one of the first three Indo-Fijian members elected to the Legislative Council (1929)
 Sharma, Tulsi Ram, Legislative Council Member (1950–1953)
 Singh, Chattur, Legislative Council Member (1937–1940)
 Singh, C.P., Legislative Council Member (1963–1966)
 Singh, K.B., Legislative Council Member (1932–1946)
 Singh, Parmanand, one of the first three Indo-Fijian members elected to the Legislative Council (1929)
 Sukuna, Ratu Sir Lala (1888–1958) – Tui Lau, soldier, first Speaker of the Legislative Council.
 Thurston, Sir John Bates, Premier of the Kingdom of Viti (1874); Governor of Fiji (1888–1897)
 Tularam, J.B., Legislative Council Member (1937–1944) representing the Eastern Constituency

Political party leaders and organizers 
 This list excludes political party leaders who have served as Prime Minister or in the Cabinet; they are included under National Leaders.
 Both parliamentary and organizational leaders are included in this list.
 Baba, Jale, businessman and General Secretary of the Soqosoqo Duavata ni Lewenivanua (SDL).
 Beddoes, Mick, leader of the United Peoples Party.
 Druavesi, Ema, Soqosoqo ni Vakavulewa ni Taukei general secretary.
 Duvuloco, Iliesa, nationalist politician, leader of the Nationalist Vanua Tako Lavo Party.
 Koroi, Jokapeci: Senator and President of the Fiji Labour Party.
 Koya, Sidiq, Leader of the Opposition National Federation Party (1970s and 1980s)
 Nagagavoka, Ratu Sairusi, founder and President of the Party of National Unity (PANU).
 Naidu, Dorsami, Leader of the National Federation Party
 Patel, Ambalal Deepak (1905–1969), founder of the National Federation Party
 Rae, Pramod, General Secretary of the National Federation Party.
 Reddy, Jai Ram, Leader of the National Federation Party (1977–1987; 1992–1999); Judge.
 Singh, Prem, former NFP leader.
 Singh, Raman Pratap, National Federation Party leader.
 Telawa, Saula, leader of the New Nationalist Party.

Parliamentarians 
 See main articles: Senate; House of Representatives.
 For the sake of size, this list includes only those parliamentarians that are not included in other categories (Cabinet Ministers, political party leaders, etc.).
 Both present and former parliamentarians are included.
 Ali, Amjad, FLP politician.
 Arjun, Nainendra, former NFP parliamentarian (d. 2006).
 Arya, Kamlesh Kumar, FLP politician.
 Babla, Anand, FLP politician.
 Bain, Atu Emberson, Fiji Labour Party Senator.
 Butadroka, Sakeasi (died 2001), nationalist politician.
 Cakobau, Ratu George, Senator and possible successor as Vunivalu of Bau.
 Chand, Dewan, FLP politician.
 Chand, Pratap, FLP politician.
 Chand, Vijay, FLP politician.
 Christopher, David Ariu, first Banaban Islander elected to the Fijian Parliament (2001)
 Dimuri, Ratu Josefa, former Senator and chief.  Convicted of involvement in the 2000 coup.
 Dobui, Manoa, SDL Member of Parliament.
 Fatiaki, John, Senator from Rotuma (2006).
 Gawander, Jai, FLP politician.
 Gaffar Ahmed, FLP politician.
 Gounder, Gunasagaran, FLP politician.
 Hussein, Azim, FLP politician.
 Hussein, Fida, FLP politician
 Kanailagi, Tomasi, Fijian clergyman and Senator.
 Kaukimoce, Jonetani, Member of Parliament.
 Khan, Hafiz, businessman and Senator.
 Krishna, James Shri, FLP politician.
 Kumar, Jain, FLP politician.
 Lakshman, Chaitanya, FLP politician.
 Lakshman, Prince Gopal, FLP politician.
 Lal, Surendra, FLP politician.
 Lesavua, Ponipate, Fijian Senator.
 Madhavan, James, long-time National Federation Party Parliamentarian.
 Maharaj, Sanjeet Chand, FLP politician.
 Malani, Ratu Wilisoni Tuiketei (died 2005), chief, medical doctor, politician.
 Manufolau, Daniel Urai, FLP Member of Parliament.
 Masilaca, Asaeli, SDL Member of Parliament.
 Matairavula, Irami, Member of Parliament.
 Mupnar, Perumal, FLP Member of Parliament.
 Nabuka, Joeli, SDL politician.
 Nailatikau, Ratu Dr. Epeli Qaraninamu, medical doctor and Senator.
 Nair, Damodran, FLP Member of Parliament.
 Nand, Gyani, FLP politician.
 Nand, Ragho, FLP politician.
 Narayan, Udit, FLP politician.
 Nawaikula, Niko, lawyer and CAMV politician.
 Nanovo, Ratu Sela, Fijian chief and Senator.
 Padarath, Lavenia, FLP politician.
 Padarath, Narendra Kumar, FLP politician.
 Patel, Vinod, NFP politician.
 Pillay, Samresan, NFP politician.
 Prasad, Krishna, FLP Member of Parliament.
 Emasi Qovu, politician.
 Raghwan, Monica, FLP politician.
 Ragiagia, Mataiasi, politician.
 Ramrhkha, K.C., NFP member of Parliament (1963–1982).
 Ravuvu, Asesela, Fijian academic and Senator.
 Reddy, Kamlesh, FLP politician.
 K. S. Reddy, pre- and post-independence politician.
 Ricketts, Tom, FLP politician.
 Samisoni, Adi Mere, SDL Member of Parliament.
 C. A. Shah, pre- and post-independence politician.
 Sharan, Ram, FLP politician.
 Nair, Vijay, FLP politician.
 Sharma, Sachida Nand, FLP politician.
 Sharma, Vyas Deo, FLP politician.
 Silatolu, Peniasi, SDL Member of Parliament.
 Silatolu, Timoci, politician convicted of treason.
 Singh, Agni Deo, FLP politician.
 Singh, Chandra, FLP politician.
 Singh, Davendra, NFP-turned-FLP politician (mid-1980s).
 Singh, Gyan, FLP Member of Parliament.
 Singh, Pravin, FLP Member of Parliament (died 2003).
 Singh, Satendra, FLP politician.
 Singh, Uday, Alliance Party politician; MP 1985–1987.
 Singh, Vijay, FLP Member of Parliament.
 Speight, George (born 1957), coup leader (2000) and parliamentarian.
 Govind Swamy (born 1951), FLP politician
 Swann, Ofa, NLUP politician.
 Tahir, Mohammed, FLP politician.
 Antonio Tanaburenisau, Parliamentarian (1999–2000).
 Tugia, Manasa, former Deputy Speaker of the House of Representatives.
 Vakalalabure, Ratu Rakuita, politician imprisoned for his role in the 2000 coup.
 Vakalalabure, Ratu Tevita, Fijian chief and politician (1927–2005).
 Vayeshnoi, Lekh Ram, Fiji Labour Party parliamentarian.
 Vuiyasawa, Adi Lagamu, businesswoman and Senator.
 Vula, Josateki, politician.

Municipal politicians 
 Bala, Parveen, Mayor of Ba Town.
 Jaduram, Paul, former Mayor of Labasa.
 Managreve, Injimo, Chairman of the Council of Rotuma.
 Umaria, Chandu, former Lord Mayor of Suva.
 Volavola, Ratu Peni, Lord Mayor of Suva.
 Williams, Josephine, businesswoman and former Mayor of Nadi (1999–2001).
 Savu, Alipate Jimi,    former Deputy Mayor of Lami.
Samisoni, Mere, former Mayor of Lami.

References

Politicians

Lists of politicians by nationality
Lists of Oceanian politicians
Politicians